Doreen Wonda Johnson is an American politician serving as a member of the New Mexico House of Representatives from the 5th district. Elected in 2014, she assumed office in 2015. Johnson is a member of the Navajo Nation.

Early life and education 
Johnson was born in Crownpoint, New Mexico. She earned a Bachelor of Arts degree in education from Marymount University in Arlington County, Virginia.

Career 
In the 2014 general election, Johnson defeated Democratic incumbent Sandra Jeff who ran as a write-in candidate after she failed to obtain sufficient signatures to qualify for the primary.

In the 2016 legislative session, Johnson served on the Committee on Compacts, the Education Committee, and the Regulatory and Public Affairs Committee.

In the 2016 primary election, Johnson was challenged by Kevin M. Mitchell, a council member of Gallup-McKinley County Schools.

References

1953 births
Living people
Democratic Party members of the New Mexico House of Representatives
Native American state legislators in New Mexico
Native American women in politics
People from Gallup, New Mexico
Women state legislators in New Mexico
People from Crownpoint, New Mexico
Marymount University alumni
21st-century American politicians
21st-century American women politicians
Navajo people